In the field of international relations, a sphere of influence (SOI) is a spatial region or concept division over which a state or organization has a level of cultural, economic, military or political exclusivity.

While there may be a formal alliance or other treaty obligations between the influenced and influencer, such formal arrangements are not necessary and the influence can often be more of an example of soft power. Similarly, a formal alliance does not necessarily mean that one country lies within another's sphere of influence. High levels of exclusivity have historically been associated with higher levels of conflict.

In more extreme cases, a country within the "sphere of influence" of another may become a subsidiary of that state and serve in effect as a satellite state or de facto colony. This was the case with the Soviet Union and its Eastern Bloc after World War II. The system of spheres of influence by which powerful nations intervene in the affairs of others continues to the present. It is often analyzed in terms of superpowers, great powers, and/or middle powers.

Sometimes portions of a single country can fall into two distinct spheres of influence. In the 19th century, the buffer states of Iran and Thailand, lying between the empires of Britain, France and Russia, were divided between the spheres of influence of those three international powers. Likewise, after World War II, Germany was divided into four occupation zones, three of which later consolidated into West Germany and the remaining one became East Germany, the former a member of NATO and the latter a member of the Warsaw Pact.

The term is also used to describe non-political situations, e.g., a shopping mall is said to have a 'sphere of influence' that designates the geographical area where it dominates the retail trade.

Historical remnants

Many powerful states in past centuries had subordinate tributary states, whose native dynasty acknowledged the suzerainty of the great power.
Many areas of the world are joined by a cultural influence inherited from a previous sphere of influence, even if they are no longer under political control.  Examples include Anglosphere, Arab World, Persosphere, Eurosphere, Francophonie, Françafrique, Germanosphere, Indosphere, Hispanidad, Latin Europe/Latin America, Lusophonie, Turkosphere,  Sinosphere, Slavisphere, Malay world, Post-Soviet States and many others.

Early United States (1820s) 

Alexander Hamilton, first U.S. Secretary of the Treasury, aimed for the United States to establish a sphere of influence in North America. Hamilton, writing in the Federalist Papers, harboured ambitions for the US to rise to world power status and gain the strength to expel European powers from the Americas, taking on the mantle of regional dominance among American nations, although most of the New World were European colonies during that period.

This doctrine, dubbed the 'Monroe Doctrine', was formalized under President James Monroe, who asserted that the New World was to be established as a Sphere of influence, removed from European encroachment. As the U.S. emerged as a world power, few nations dared to trespass on this sphere. (A notable exception occurred with the Soviet Union and the Cuban Missile Crisis.)

As of 2018, Secretary of State Rex Tillerson continued to refer to the Monroe Doctrine to tout the United States as the region's preferred trade partner over other nations such as China.

New Imperialism era (late 1800s – early 1900s) 

For Siam (Thailand), Britain and France signed an agreement in 1904 whereby the British recognised a French sphere of influence to the east of the River Menam's (Chao Phraya River) basin; in turn, the French recognised British influence over the territory to the west of the Menam basin and west of the Gulf of Thailand. Both parties disclaimed any idea of annexing Siamese territory.

In the Anglo-Russian Convention of 1907, Britain and Russia divided Persia (Iran) into spheres of influence, with the Russians gaining recognition for influence over most of northern Iran, and Britain establishing a zone in the Southeast.

China
In China, during the mid 19th and 20th centuries (known in China as the "century of humiliation"), Great Britain, France, Germany, Russia, and Japan held special powers over large swaths of Chinese territory based on securing "nonalienation commitments" for their "spheres of interest"; only the United States was unable to participate due to their involvement in the Spanish–American War. These spheres of influence were acquired by forcing the Qing government to sign "unequal treaties" and long-term leases.

In early 1895, the French laid claim to a sphere in Southwest China. By December 1897, German Kaiser Wilhelm II declared his intent to seize territory in China, precipitating the scramble to demarcate zones of influence in China. The Germans acquired, in Shandong province, exclusive control over developmental loans, mining, and railway ownership, while Russia gained a sphere over all territory north of the Great Wall, in addition to the previous tax exemption for trade in Mongolia and Xinjiang, economic powers similar to Germany's over Fengtian, Jilin, and Heilongjiang provinces. France gained a sphere over Yunnan, as well as most of Guangxi and Guangdong provinces; Japan over Fujian province; and the British over the whole Yangtze River valley (defined as all provinces adjoining the Yangtze river as well as Henan and Zhejiang provinces), parts of Guangdong and Guangxi provinces, and part of Tibet. Only Italy's request for Zhejiang province was declined by the Chinese government. These do not include the lease and concession territories where the foreign powers had full authority.

The Russian government militarily occupied their zone, imposed their law and schools, seized mining and logging privileges, settled their citizens, and even established their municipal administration on several cities, the latter without Chinese consent.

The powers (and the United States) might have their own courts, post offices, commercial institutions, railroads, and gunboats in what was on paper Chinese territory. However, the foreign powers and their control in some cases could have been exaggerated; the local government persistently restricted further encroachment. The system ended after the Second World War.

On September 6, 1899, U.S. Secretary of State John Hay sent notes to the major powers (France, Germany, Britain, Italy, Japan, and Russia), asking them to declare formally that they would uphold Chinese territorial and administrative integrity and would not interfere with the free use of the treaty ports within their spheres of influence in China, as the United States felt threatened by other powers' much larger spheres of influence in China and worried that it might lose access to the Chinese market should the country be officially partitioned. Although treaties made after 1900 refer to this "Open Door Policy", competition among the various powers for special concessions within China for railroad rights, mining rights, loans, foreign trade ports, and so forth, continued unabated, with the US itself contradicting the policy by agreeing to recognise the Japanese sphere in the Lansing-Ishii Agreement.

In 1910, the great powers, Britain, France, Germany, United States, and later, Russia and Japan, ignored the Open Door Policy to form a banking consortium, consisting of national banking groups backed by respective governments, through which all foreign loans to China were monopolised, granting the powers political influence over China and reducing economic competition between foreigners. This organisation controlled the majority of Chinese tax revenue in a "trust", utilising a small portion to bolster the rule of Chinese warlord Yuan Shikai to great effect. The renewed consortium of UK, France, Japan and the U.S. in 1920 effectively vetoed all developmental loans to China, exerting control over the Chinese government by aiming to control all railroads, ports and highways in China. The Consortium helped to contain the political and financial conflict between parties and states over the loans, while imposing foreign control on China's finances during the period of revolutionary upheaval, which the Consortium also helped to precipitate.

World War II (1939–1945)

Empire of Japan 

For another example, during the height of its existence in World War II, the Japanese Empire had quite a large sphere of influence. The Japanese government directly governed events in Korea, Vietnam, Taiwan, and parts of Mainland China. The "Greater East Asia Co-Prosperity Sphere" could thus be quite easily drawn on a map of the Pacific Ocean as a large "bubble" surrounding the islands of Japan and the Asian and Pacific nations it controlled.

Molotov–Ribbentrop Pact
According to a secret protocol attached to the Molotov–Ribbentrop Pact of 1939 (revealed only after Germany's defeat in 1945), Northern and Eastern Europe were divided into Nazi and Soviet spheres of influence:

 In the north, Finland, Estonia, and Latvia were assigned to the Soviet sphere.
 Poland was to be partitioned in the event of its "political rearrangement"—the areas east of the Narev, Vistula, and San Rivers going to the Soviet Union, while Germany would occupy the west.
 Lithuania, adjacent to East Prussia, would be in the German sphere of influence, although a second secret protocol agreed in September 1939 assigned Lithuania to the USSR.

Another clause of the treaty stipulated that Bessarabia, then part of Romania, would join the Moldovan ASSR and become the Moldovan SSR under the control of Moscow. The Soviet invasion of Bukovina on 28 June 1940 violated the Molotov-Ribbentrop Pact, as it went beyond the Soviet sphere of influence as agreed with the Axis. The USSR continued to deny the existence of the Pact's protocols until after the dissolution of the Soviet Union when the Russian government fully acknowledged the existence and authenticity of the secret protocols.

End of World War II
From 1941 and the German attack on the Soviet Union, the Allied Coalition operated on the unwritten assumption that the Western Powers and the Soviet Union had each its own sphere of influence. The presumption of the US-British and Soviet unrestricted rights in their respective spheres began to cause difficulties as the Nazi-controlled territory shrank and the allied powers successively liberated other states.

The wartime spheres lacked a practical definition and it had never been determined if a dominant allied power was entitled to unilateral decisions only in the area of military activity, or could also force its will regarding political, social and economic future of other states. This overly informal system backfired during the late stages of the war and afterward, when it turned out that the Soviets and the Western Allies had very different ideas concerning the administration and future development of the liberated regions and of Germany itself.

Cold War (1947–1991) 

During the Cold War, the Soviet sphere of influence was said to include: the Baltic states, Central Europe, some countries in Eastern Europe, Cuba, Laos, Vietnam, North Korea, and—until the Sino-Soviet split and Tito–Stalin split—the People's Republic of China and the People's Federal Republic of Yugoslavia, among other countries at various times. Meanwhile, United States was considered to have a sphere of influence over Western Europe, Oceania, Japan, and South Korea, among other places.

However, the level of control exerted in these spheres varied and was not absolute. For instance, France and the United Kingdom were able to act independently to invade (with Israel) the Suez Canal (they were later forced to withdraw by joint U.S. and Soviet pressure). Later, France was also able to withdraw from the military arm of the North Atlantic Treaty Organization (NATO). Cuba, as another example, often took positions that put it at odds with its Soviet ally, including momentary alliances with China, economic reorganizations, and providing support for insurgencies in Africa and the Americas without prior approval from the Soviet Union.

With the end of the Cold War, the Eastern Bloc fell apart, effectively ending the Soviet sphere of influence. Then in 1991, the Soviet Union ceased to exist, replaced by the Russian Federation and several other ex-Soviet Republics who became independent states.

Contemporary Russia (1990s–present) 

Following the fall of the Soviet Union, the countries of the Commonwealth of Independent States that became independent in 1991, were portrayed as part of the Russian Federation's 'sphere of influence', according to a statement by Boris Yeltsin, dated September 1994.

According to Ulrich Speck, writing for Carnegie Europe, "After the breakup of the Soviet Union, the West's focus was on Russia. Western nations implicitly treated the post-Soviet countries (besides the Baltic states) as Russia's sphere of influence."

In 1997, NATO and Russia signed the Founding Act on Mutual Relations, Cooperation and Security, stating the "aim of creating in Europe a common space of security and stability, without dividing lines or spheres of influence limiting the sovereignty of any state."

On August 31, 2008, Russian president Dmitri Medvedev stated five principles of foreign policy, including the claim of a privileged sphere of influence that comprised "the border region, but not only". In 2009, Russia asserted that the European Union desires a sphere of influence and that the Eastern Partnership is "an attempt to extend" it. In March that year, Swedish Foreign Minister Carl Bildt stated that the "Eastern Partnership is not about spheres of influence. The difference is that these countries themselves opted to join."

Following the 2008 Russo-Georgian War, Václav Havel and other former central and eastern European leaders signed an open letter stating that Russia had "violated the core principles of the Helsinki Final Act, the Charter of Paris ... all in the name of defending a sphere of influence on its borders." In April 2014, NATO stated that, contrary to the Founding Act,Russia now appears to be attempting to recreate a sphere of influence by seizing a part of Ukraine, maintaining large numbers of forces on its borders, and demanding, as Russian Foreign Minister Sergei Lavrov recently stated, that "Ukraine cannot be part of any bloc."Criticising Russia in November 2014, German Chancellor Angela Merkel said that "old thinking about spheres of influence, which runs roughshod over international law" put the "entire European peace order into question." In January 2017, British Prime Minister Theresa May said, "We should not jeopardise the freedoms that President Reagan and Mrs Thatcher brought to Eastern Europe by accepting President Putin's claim that it is now in his sphere of influence."

Contemporary United States (1991–present)

Corporations
In corporate terms, the sphere of influence of a business, organization, or group can show its power and influence in the decisions of other businesses/organizations/groups. The influence shows in several ways, such as in size, frequency of visits, etc. In most cases, a company described as "bigger" has a larger sphere of influence.

For example, the software company Microsoft has a large sphere of influence in the market of operating systems; any entity wishing to sell a software product may weigh up compatibility with Microsoft's products as part of a marketing plan. In another example, retailers wishing to make the most profits must ensure they open their stores in the correct location. This is also true for shopping centers that, to reap the most profits, must be able to attract customers to their vicinity.

There is no defined scale measuring such spheres of influence. However, one can evaluate the spheres of influence of two shopping centers by seeing how far people are prepared to travel to each shopping center, how much time they spend in its vicinity, how often they visit, the order of goods available, etc.

Corporations have significant influence on the regulations and regulators that monitor them. During the Gilded Age in the United States, corruption was rampant as business leaders spent significant amounts of money ensuring that government did not regulate their activities. Wall Street spent a record $2 billion trying to influence the 2016 United States elections.

List of spheres of influence

 America's Backyard — areas of United States' influence in the American continent 
 Anglosphere — English-speaking world
 East Asian cultural sphere (aka Sinosphere) — historically Chinese-influenced cultures
 Eurasianism - Russian Federation and its environs
 Eurosphere — area with European Union influence
 Francosphere — French-speaking world
 Germanosphere — German-speaking world
 Greater East Asia Co-Prosperity Sphere — imperial influence of the Japanese Empire
 Hispanosphere — Spanish-speaking world
 Indosphere — area with Indian linguistic and cultural influence (Greater India)
 Islamosphere — the Muslim world
 Persophere — historically Iran-influenced cultures
 Slavisphere — Slavic influence
 Soviet sphere of influence — imperial influence of the Soviet Union

Other examples

For historical and current examples of significant battles over spheres of influence see:

 The Great Game
 Geostrategy in Central Asia

See also
 Cultural area
Geopolitics
 National interest
 Balance of power in international relations
Sprachbund
 Unequal treaty
 Informal empire

References

Further reading

 Ferguson, Iain, and Susanna Hast. 2018. "Introduction: The Return of Spheres of Influence? [PDF]" Geopolitics 23(2):277-84. .
 Hast, Susanna. 2016. Spheres of Influence in International Relations: History, Theory and Politics. Milton Park, UK: Routledge. 
 Icenhower, Brian. 2018. "SOI: Building a Real Estate Agent's Sphere of Influence." CreateSpace Independent Publishing Platform.
 Piffanelli, Luciano. 2018. "Crossing Boundaries: A Problem of Territoriality in Renaissance Italy", Viator. Medieval and Renaissance Studies, 49(3):245-275.
 White, Craig Howard. 1992. Sphere of Influence, Star of Empire: American Renaissance Cosmos, Vol. 1. Madison: University of Wisconsin-Madison.

External links

 The CommonCensus Map Project – Calculates the spheres of influence for American cities based on voting
 Russia - a counterbalancing agent to the Asia.

Political science theories
International relations theory
Sociological terminology
Social influence
Geopolitics